Flush the Fashion is the fifth solo studio album by American singer Alice Cooper, released on April 28, 1980 by Warner Bros. Records. It was recorded at Cherokee Studios in Los Angeles with producer Roy Thomas Baker, known for his work with Queen and the Cars. Musically, the album was a drastic change of style for Cooper, leaning towards a new wave influence. The lead single "Clones (We're All)" peaked at No. 40 on the U.S. Billboard Top 40.

Background
The album's ten tracks touch on themes such as the loss of identity, taking on other roles, and the usual Alice Cooper-esque dementia. This is evident even in the lyrics of Flush the Fashion's cover songs (for example the "Clones" single). Cooper also performs several "story" songs, presenting a series of intriguing vignettes in lieu of more traditional subject matter. By the time of Flush the Fashion, after a much-publicized stint in a sanitarium in 1977 for alcoholism and subsequent sobriety, Cooper had secretly developed a heavy addiction to cocaine, although, unlike his subsequent three studio albums Cooper has some recollection – if not perfect – of making Flush the Fashion.

Cooper did tour the album through the United States and Mexico City during 1980, playing "Clones (We're All)", "Pain", "Model Citizen", "Grim Facts", "Talk Talk", "Dance Yourself to Death" and "Nuclear Infected" on a regular basis. The first four songs remained part of the setlist for the Special Forces tour a year later. Since 1982, songs from Flush the Fashion, as with all Cooper's albums from between 1976 and 1983, have rarely been performed live. The only cases have been:
"Clones (We're All)", of which there were a few irregular performances between 1996 and 2003 and was a regular part of Cooper's setlist during the 2011–2012 'No More Mr. Nice Guy' tour
"Pain", which was regular on Cooper's 2017 'Spend the Night with Alice Cooper' tour, and
"Grim Facts" with was part of "A Paranormal Evening with Alice Cooper" in 2018.

According to Alice Cooper on his radio show on October 5, 2020, all the song titles on this album were taken from Headlines (hence Track #10) from the National Enquirer.

Track listing

Personnel
Credits are adapted from the Flush the Fashion liner notes.

Musicians
 Alice Cooper – vocals
 Davey Johnstone – lead guitar
 Fred Mandel – keyboards; guitar; backing vocals
 Dennis Conway – drums
 John Cooker Lopresti – bass guitar
 Flo & Eddie – backing vocals
 Joe Pizzulo – backing vocals
 Keith Allison – backing vocals
 Ricky "Rat" Tierney – backing vocals

Production and artwork
 Roy Thomas Baker – producer
 Ian Taylor – engineer
 John Weaver – assistant engineer
 Eddy Herch – design
 Jonathan Exley – back cover and sleeve photography
 Fred Valentine – front cover photography
 Alice Cooper – art direction
 Peter Whorf – art direction

Charts

References

External links
 

Alice Cooper albums
1980 albums
Albums produced by Roy Thomas Baker
Warner Records albums